Fariborz Maseeh Hall (formerly Neuberger Hall) is a building on the Portland State University campus in Portland, Oregon, United States. The first section of the building was completed in October 1961 and was originally known as South Park Hall.  The second section was built as an addition and was completed in July 1969. The building underwent a $70 million renovation between January 2018 and August 2019. The building was renamed to the current name at the completion of the modernization.

Name history 
South Park Hall, 1960-1972

Neuberger Hall, 1972-2018

Fariborz Maseeh Hall  September 26, 2019-present.

References

External links
 

1960s establishments in Oregon
Portland State University buildings